
Louis Alexis Hocquet de Caritat was a French-born bookseller and publisher in New York in the late 18th and early 19th centuries. He operated a rental library and a reading room located in 1802 at "City-Hotel, Fenelon's Head, Broad-Way." He served as the "authorized distributor of Minerva Press books'" in the U. States. He stocked some 30,000 volumes including imported titles in English and French language, and occasionally non-print items such as "sparkling white champaign wine."

One of Caritat's contemporary admirers wrote in 1803:

I would place the bust of Caritat among those of the Sosii of Horace, and the Centryphon of Quintillian. He was my only friend at New-York, when the energies of my mind were depressed by the chilling prospect of poverty. His talents, were not meanly cultivated by letters; he could tell a good book from a bad one, which few modern librarians can do. But place aux dames was his maxim, and all the ladies of New-York declared that the library of Mr. Caritat was charming. Its shelves could scarcely sustain the weight of Female Frailty, the Posthumous Daughter, and the Cavern of Woe; they required the aid of the carpenter to support the burden of the Cottage-on-the-Moor, the House of Tynian, and the Castles of Athlin and Dunbayne; or they groaned under the multiplied editions of the Devil in Love, More Ghosts, and Rinaldo Rinaldini. Novels were called for by the young and the old; from the tender virgin of thirteen, whose little heart went pit-a-pat at the approach of a beau; to the experienced matron of three score, who could not read without spectacles.

See also
 Books in the United States

References

Further reading

 H Caritat's Literary Room. Morning Chronicle; Date: 06-08-1803
 Caritat, ed. Bibliothèque américaine: contenant des mémoires sur l'agriculture, le commerce, les manufactures, les moeurs et les usages de l'Amérique; l'analyse des ouvrages scientifiques de ce pays, ainsi que de ceux des Européens qui y ont voyagé; et des extraits des journaux publiés en Amérique, sur tout ce qui peut intéresser le commerc̜ant et l'homme d'état; par une sociéte de savans et d'hommes de lettres. Paris, 1807. Google books

Issued by Caritat
 John Davis. The original letters of Ferdinand and Elisabeth. 1798
 Charles Brockden Brown. Wieland; or The transformation. An American tale. NY: printed by T. & J. Swords, for H. Caritat, 1798
 François René Jean, Baron de Pommereul. Campaign of General Buonaparte in Italy, during the fourth and fifth years of the French republic. By a general officer. 1798
 Charles Brockden Brown. Ormond; or, the Secret Witness. New-York: Printed by G. Forman, for H. Caritat, 1799.
 Bernardin de Saint-Pierre. Beauties of the Studies of nature: selected from the works of Saint Pierre. New-York: Re-printed for H. Caritat, bookseller, stationer & librarian, by M.L. & W.A. Davis., 1799.
 Johann Georg Zimmermann. Essay on national pride; translated by Samuel H. Wilcocke. New York: Printed by M.L. & W.A. Davis, for H. Caritat, bookseller and librarian, 1799.
 Thomas Morton. Speed the plough: a comedy, in five acts. New-York: re-printed by M.L. & W.A. Davis, for H. Caritat, bookseller, no. 153 Broad-way, 1800.
 M.G. Lewis. The East Indian: a comedy, in five acts. New-York: re-printed by M.L. & W.A. Davis, for H. Caritat, bookseller, no. 153 Broad-Way, 1800.
 Helen Maria Williams. The political and confidential correspondence of Lewis XVI: with observations on each letter. 1803
Catalogs
 The feast of reason and the flow of the soul. A new explanatory catalogue of H. Caritat's general & increasing circulating library. 1799
 Catalogue des livres francais qui se trouvent chez H. Caritat, libraire et bibliothécaire dans Broad-Way, no. 157. 1799

About Caritat
 George Gates Raddin. An early New York library of fiction : with a checklist of the fiction in H. Caritat's circulating library, no. 1 City hotel, Broadway, New York, 1804. New York : Wilson, 1940.
 George Gates Raddin. Hocquet Caritat and the Early New York Literary Scene (Dover, N.J., 1953)
 Leroy Elwood Kimball. "An account of Hocquet Caritat." Colophon, 1934

History of New York City
Bookstores in Manhattan
Businesspeople from New York City
French booksellers
Libraries in Manhattan
Commercial circulating libraries
1790s in the United States
1800s in the United States